Marzalat (also Romanized as Marzalāt) is a village in Otaqvar Rural District, Otaqvar District, Langarud County, Gilan Province, Iran. At the 2006 census, its population was 85, in 28 families.

References 

Populated places in Langarud County